Geraldine Johns-Putra (born 1973) is a Malaysian and Australian Woman FIDE Master (WFM) (2000).

Biography
In 1999, in Gold Coast Geraldine Johns-Putra shared  2nd-3rd place in Women's World Chess Championship Oceania Zonal tournament. In 2000, Geraldine Johns-Putra participated in Women's World Chess Championship by knock-out system and in the first round lost to Joanna Dworakowska.

Geraldine Johns-Putra played for Malaysia in the Women's Chess Olympiads:
 In 1998, at third board in the 33rd Chess Olympiad (women) in Elista (+7, =2, -4),
 In 2000, at second board in the 34th Chess Olympiad (women) in Istanbul (+3, =5, -4),
 In 2002, at third board in the 35th Chess Olympiad (women) in Bled (+4, =3, -4).

References

External links

Geraldine Johns-Putra chess games at 365Chess.com

1973 births
Living people
Australian female chess players
Malaysian chess players
Chess Woman FIDE Masters
Chess Olympiad competitors